YTH domain-containing protein 1 is a protein that in humans is encoded by the YTHDC1 gene. YTHDC1 is a nuclear protein involved in splice site selection that localises to YT bodies; dynamic subnuclear compartments, which first appear at the beginning of S-phase in the cell cycle and disperse during mitosis.

Interactions 

YTHDC1 has been shown to interact with:
 Abl gene,
 C-src tyrosine kinase, 
 Emerin,
 KHDRBS1. and
 Metadherin

Role in disease 
Alternative splicing is altered in a number of diseases and is particularly relevant to cancer.

Cancer 
YTHDC1 has been shown to splice mRNA transcripts which have  oncological importance, regulating tumour functions such as hypoxia associated vascular endothelial growth factor (VEGF), DNA damage associated breast cancer 1 (BRCA1) and hormonal growth driver; the  progesterone receptor (PGR).

In prostate cancer, YTHDC1 has also been shown to interact with the protein metadherin, encoded by the oncogene MTDH acting to influence alternative splicing of tumour-related genes such as CD44.

See also 
N6-Methyladenosine

References

Further reading